USS Chehalis (PGM-94/PG-94) was an  of the U.S. Navy and the second ship to be named Chehalis. Chehalis was launched 8 June 1968 at the Tacoma Boatbuilding Company. She was commissioned 8 November 1969. The vessel was named in honor of Chehalis, a city in Washington state. Later, she was transferred to Naval Sea Systems Command and renamed Research Vessel Athena. Athena was scrapped in 2016.

The Chehalis was powered by a combination of two Cummins diesel engines and a General Electric LM-1500 gas turbine.  Pneumatic actuators allowed the power source to be switched between the two sources.

References

NavSource PG-94

External links
 Patrol Gunboat Association – USS Chehalis
 Research Vessel Athena
 Research Vessel Athena datasheet
 NAVSEA Research vessels
 

Asheville-class gunboats
Patrol vessels of the United States Navy
Cold War patrol vessels of the United States
Ships built by Tacoma Boatbuilding Company
1968 ships
Chehalis, Washington